Lema is a genus of beetles in the family Chrysomelidae.

Selected species
Over 1300 species are in the genus Lema, organised into several subgenera:

Subgenus Lema Curtis, 1830
Lema cirsicola Chûjô, 1959
Lema concinnipennis Baly, 1865
Lema coreensis Monrós, 1960
Lema coronata Baly, 1873
Lema cyanella Linnaeus, 1758
Lema delicatula Baly, 1873
Lema dilecta Baly, 1873
Lema diversa Baly, 1873
Lema externevittata Pic, 1943
Lema fortunei Baly, 1859
Lema praeusta (Fabricius, 1792)
Lema puncticollis Curtis, 1830
Lema scutellaris (Kraatz, 1879)

Subgenus Microlema Pic, 1932

 Lema decempunctata (Gebler, 1829)
Subgenus Petauristes Latreille, 1829

 Lema adamsii Baly, 1865
 Lema honorata Baly, 1873

Subgenus Quasilema Monrós, 1951
Lema balteata LeConte, 1884
Lema bilineata (Germar, 1823)
Lema circumvittata Clark in Bates and Clark, 1866
Lema confusa Chevrolat, 1835
Lema conjuncta Lacordaire, 1845
Lema daturaphila Kogan and Goeden, 1970
Lema maderensis R. White, 1993
Lema melanofrons R. White, 1993
Lema nigrovittata (Sahlberg, 1878)
Lema opulenta Harold in Gemminger & Harold, 1874
Lema pubipes Clark in Bates and Clark, 1866 
Lema solani Fabricius, 1798
Lema trivittata Weber, 1909

References

Criocerinae
Chrysomelidae genera